USS Pontiac (YT-20) was a harbor tugboat purchased by the U.S. Navy during World War I. She was assigned to the New York harbor area and performed her towing tasks there until war’s end. Post-war she was found to be excess to needs and sold.

Built in Athens, New York
The second ship to be so named by the U.S. Navy, Pontiac was laid down as Right Arm in 1891 by Peter McGishan, Athens, New York; purchased by the Navy from Merritt & Chapman 23 April 1898; renamed Pontiac 23 April.
 
Pontiac served in harbors along the north Atlantic Ocean coast of the United States. She operated in yards such as New York, New York; Boston, Massachusetts; New London, Connecticut; and, Charleston, South Carolina.

World War I service
Pontiac commissioned 1 July 1911. During World War I, she concentrated efforts at New York City, a major center for domestic and foreign commerce. She was renamed Passaic 11 April 1918.

Post-war decommissioning
Continuing harbor and district tug operations after the war, she decommissioned and was placed on the sale list in 1921. She was sold to John Kantzler & Sons, Bay City, Michigan, 25 February 1922.

References
  
 NavSource Online: Pontiac - YT-20 Passaic

World War I auxiliary ships of the United States
Tugs of the United States Navy
Ships built in New York (state)